Seymour Independent School District is a public school district based in Seymour, Texas. Located in Baylor County, a small portion of the district extends into Knox County.

In 2009, the school district was rated "academically acceptable" by the Texas Education Agency.

Schools
In the 2012–2013 school year, the district had students in three schools. 
Seymour High School (Grades 9–12)
Seymour Middle School (Grades 5–8)
Seymour Elementary School (Grades EE–4)

References

External links
Seymour ISD

School districts in Baylor County, Texas
School districts in Knox County, Texas